WMID (1340 kHz) is a radio station licensed to Atlantic City, New Jersey, which plays "the classic oldies". Its parent company is Equity Communications (the station was at one time owned by entertainer Merv Griffin). WMID also carries the Philadelphia Phillies. Its studios are located on East Black Horse Pike in the West Atlantic City section of Egg Harbor Township, and its transmitter is located on Murray Avenue in Atlantic City.

History
WMID began broadcasting May 30, 1947. It was a Mutual affiliate on 1340 kHz with 250 W of power.

In the 1950s, WMID broadcast from a small studio in the old Brighton Hotel that stood in the beach block of Indiana Avenue, across the street from the Claridge Hotel.  The Brighton was torn down to make way for the Sands Casino, itself now closed and demolished. Since the 1960s the station has broadcast from studios adjacent to its tower site at Ohio and Murray Avenues, just off U.S. Route 30 next to the Jersey-Atlantic Wind Farm.

During the fifties, sixties, and early to mid-seventies, WMID was the dominant Top 40 station in the Atlantic City area.  In its peak years as a Top 40 station in the early to mid-seventies, it was known as "The Jersey Giant", although for a while after the introduction of gambling in Atlantic City, it labeled itself "the Lucky 13".  Its play during its peak years was extremely formatted, with the number one song of the week repeated every two hours, with new songs being labeled "future giants", and, in keeping with the city's resort image, with oldies being labeled "souvenirs".  The station presented a locally produced "top 40 countdown" every Monday night.  The station also boasted a strong jingle package with a classic "WMID, Atlantic City" station ID at the top of the hour, with the disc jockey introduction, "From the Jersey Giant, Jackson Chase (or other disc jockey)" once an hour, with the introduction of the number one song, "WMID, Giant Play One, Play One, Play One," and with other catchy jingles, such as, "The World Comes Here to Play, 1340, WMID",  "Summer at the Jersey Shore, 1340, Atlantic City, WMID".  News was limited several minutes leading to the top of the hour from ABC's American Contemporary Radio.  In summary, at its peak, WMID in the early to mid seventies was one of the most professionally run and cleanly produced small to medium-market stations in the country.  As AM broadcasting listenership declined in the late seventies, the station went through a series of format changes (including Adult Contemporary and Big Band) before settling on the oldies format.

Classic Oldies 1340 AM WMID focuses on the history of music and radio when rock and roll was on AM radio. The mission of WMID is to re-create the old days when the memorable sound of rock & roll dominated the AM frequency, a sound no one who experienced has ever forgotten. WMID plays the songs and voices – the timeless music that is never left the rock and roll generation – all day and all night. The motto of the station is: "It’s the Music you grew up with on the Station you grew up with: AM 1340 Classic Oldies WMID".

From January 2, 2012 until March 2021, WMID was the Atlantic City affiliate for The Rush Limbaugh Show.

On Sunday mornings, the station airs the syndicated Sounds of Sinatra with Sid Mark.

The station briefly aired in 2017 on W230AA at 93.9 MHz FM before W230AA switched to WSJO-HD2.

Coverage
WMID serves Atlantic City, Ocean City, and Long Beach Island. Due to 1340 being a popular frequency in the area, there will be interference between WMID and WHAT in Philadelphia. Also, WRAW in Reading, Pennsylvania may cause some interference depending on where the listener is located.

Previous Logos

See also
 WCMC (AM)

References

External links
FCC History Cards for WMID
WMID official website

Oldies radio stations in the United States
MID
Radio stations established in 1971
1971 establishments in New Jersey